Ghassan Shakaa (1943 – 25 Jan 2018) was a Palestinian politician who was the mayor of Nablus in 1994–2004 and in 2012–2015. one of the largest cities in the West Bank. His uncle, Bassam Shaka was another former Nablus mayor. Shakaa was appointed to his position by Yasser Arafat. His brother was unfortunately assassinated by an unknown group that still has not been identified. Shakaa published an open letter in which he called for the Palestinian National Authority to restore order to his politically divided city.

References 

1943 births
2018 deaths
Mayors of Nablus
Members of the Executive Committee of the Palestine Liberation Organization